Plusiotricha is a genus of moths of the family Noctuidae.

Species
 Plusiotricha carcassoni Dufay, 1972
 Plusiotricha fletcheri Dufay, 1972
 Plusiotricha gorilla Holland, 1894
 Plusiotricha livida Holland, 1894
 Plusiotricha pratti Kenrick, 1917

References
 Natural History Museum Lepidoptera genus database
 Plusiotricha at funet.fi

Plusiinae